The Clavigeritae form a supertribe of beetles belonging to the family Staphylinidae.

Systematics 
The Clavigeritae comprise the following tribes:
 Clavigerini
 Colilodionini
 Tiracerini
  Protoclavigerini

References 

 
Supertribes